The Army of the Mughal Empire was the force by which the Mughal emperors established their empire in the 15th century and expanded it to its greatest extent at the beginning of the 18th century. Although its origins, like the Mughals themselves, were in the cavalry-based armies of central Asia, its essential form and structure was established by the empire's third emperor, Akbar.

The army had no regimental structure and the soldiers were not directly recruited by the emperor. Instead, individuals, such as nobles or local leaders, would recruit their own troops, referred to as a mansab, and contribute them to the army.

Origin
The Mughals originated in Central Asia. Like many Central Asian armies, the mughal army of Babur was horse-oriented. The ranks and pay of the officers were based on the horses they retained. Babur's army was small and inherited the Timurid military traditions of central Asia. It would be wrong to assume that Babur introduced a gunpowder warfare system, because mounted archery remained the vital part of his army. Babur's empire did not last long and the mughal empire collapsed with the expulsion of Humayun, and the mughal empire founded by Akbar in 1556 proved more stable and enduring. Akbar restructured the army and introduced a new system called the mansabdari system. Therefore, the essential structure of the Mughal army started from the reign of Akbar.

Organisation and troop types
Mughal emperors maintained a small standing army. They numbered only in thousands. Instead the officers called mansabdars provided much of the troops.

Standing army
The Mughal Emperors maintained small standing armies. The emperor's own house hold troops were called Ahadis. They were directly recruited by the Mughal emperor himself, mainly from the emperor's own blood relatives and tribesmen. They had their own pay roll and pay master, and were better paid than normal horsemen sowars. They were gentlemen soldiers, some of them normally in administrative duties in the palace.

The Walashahis or royal bodyguard were regarded as the most trusted and faithful part of the troops, being directly in the pay of the Emperor. They were chiefly, if not entirely, men who had been attached to the Emperor from his youth and had served him while he was only a prince and were thus marked out in a special manner as his personal attendants and household troops.

The emperor also maintained a division of foot soldiers and had his own artillery brigade.

Mansabdars

Akbar introduced this unique system. The Mughal army had no regimental structure. In this system, a military officer worked for the government who was responsible for recruiting and maintaining his quota of horsemen. His rank was based on the horsemen he provided, which ranged from 10(the lowest), up to 5000. A prince had the rank of 25000. This was called the zat and sowar system.

An officer had to keep men and horses in a ratio of 1:2. The horses had to be carefully verified and branded, and Arabian horses were preferred. The officer also had to maintain his quota of horses, elephants and cots for transportation, as well as foot soldiers and artillery. Soldiers were given the option to be paid either in monthly/annual payments or jagir, but many chose jagir. The emperor also allocated jagir to mansabdars for maintenance of the mansabs.

Branches
There were four branches of the Mughal army: the cavalry (Aswaran), the infantry (Paidgan), the artillery (Topkhana) and the navy. These were not divisions with their own commanders, instead they were branches or classes that were distributed individually amongst the Mansabdars, each of whom had some of each of these divisions. The exception to this rule was the artillery, which was a specialized corps with its own designated commander, and was not part of the mansabdari troops. The cavalry held the primary role in the army, while the others were auxiliary.

Cavalry

The cavalry was the most superior branch of the Mughal army. The Barha tribe of Indian Muslims traditionally composed the vanguard of the imperial army, which they held the hereditary right to lead in every battle. The horsemen normally recruited by mansabdars were high-class people and were better paid than foot soldiers and artillerymen. They had to possess at least two of their own horses and good equipment. The regular horseman was called a sowar.  Normally they used swords, lances, shields, more rarely guns. Their armour was made up of steel or leather, and they wore the traditional dress of their tribes. Mughal armour was not as heavy as Europe, due to the heat, but was heavier than the south indian outfits. The armour consisted of two layers; the first consisting of steel plates and helmets to secure the head, breast, and limbs. Underneath this steel network of armour was worn an upper garment of cotton or linen quilted thick enough to resist a sword or a bullet, which came down as far as the knees. Silken pants as the lower garment and a pair of kashmir shawls wrapped around the waist completed this costume. There was a habit of covering the body in protective garments until little beyond a man's eyes could be seen.

Adapted to fighting pitched battles in the northern Indian plains, the Mughals were frontal-combat oriented, and shock-charge tactics of the heavy cavalry armed with swords and lances was popular in Mughal armies. In times of crisis at battle, the Muslim Mughals would perform a type of fighting called Utara, the act of dismounting from their horses and fighting on foot until they were killed rather than ride away and escape with their lives.

Elephants 

Mughal cavalry also included elephants, normally used by generals. They bore well ornamented and good armour. Mainly they were used for transportation to carry heavy goods and heavy guns. Some of the Rajput mansabdar's also provided camel cavalry. They were men from desert areas like Rajasthan.

The key to Mughal power in India was its use of warhorses and also its control of the supply of superior warhorses from Central Asia. This was confirmed by victories in the Battle of Panipat, the Battle of Machhiwara, Battle of Dharmatpur, and in eyewitness accounts such as Father Monserrate, which primarily featured the use of traditional Turko-Mongol horse archer tactics rather than gunpowder. Cavalry warfare came to replace the logistically difficult elephant warfare and chaotic mass infantry tactics. Rajputs were co-opted by converting them into cavalry despite their traditions of fighting on foot. This was similar to the Marathas' service to the Deccan Sultanates.

Infantry

The infantry was recruited either by Mansabdars, or by the emperor himself. The emperor's own infantry was called Ahsam.  They were normally ill-paid and ill-equipped, and also lacked discipline. This group included bandukchi or gun bearers, swordsmen, as well as servants and artisans.
They used a wide variety of weapons like swords, shields, lances, clubs, pistols, rifles, muskets, etc. They normally wore no armour.

Banduqchis
The Banduqchis were the musketmen in the infantry. They formed the bulk of the Mughal infantry. Locally recruited and equipped with matchlocks, bows and spears, the infantry were despised so much that they were virtually equated with litter bearers, woodworkers, cotton carders in the army payrolls. Their matchlocks were thrice as slow as the mounted archers. Chronicles hardly mention them in battle accounts. Indian Muslims usually enlisted in the cavalry and seldom recruited in the infantry, looking down at fighting with muskets with contempt. The Banduqchis were mainly made up of Hindus of various castes who were known for their skills as gunmen, such as the Bundelas, the Karnatakas and the men of Buxar.

Shamsherbaz
The main infantry was supplemented by specialized units such as the Shamsherbaz. Meaning "sword-wielders" or "gladiators", the Shamsherbaz were elite heavy infantry companies of highly skilled swordsmen. As their name implies, a few of them were assigned to the court to serve as palace guards, or participate in mock-battles of exhibitions of skill. However, tens of thousands of them were assigned to army units by the Mansabdars around the Mughal Empire. The Shamsherbaz were frequently used in siege warfare, where they would be unleashed to deal with the resistance once the walls were breached with explosives or artillery. Much of the Shamsherbaz were recruited from religious sects such as Sufi orders.

Artillery

The artillery was a specialized corps with its own designated commander, the Mir-i-Atish. The office of Mir-i-Atish grew in importance during the time of the later Mughals. Being in charge of the defense of the Imperial Palace Fort and being in personal contact with the Emperor, the Mir-i-Atish commander great influence. Mughal artillery consisted of heavy cannons, light artillery, grenadiers and raketies. Heavy cannons were very expensive and heavy for transportation, and had to be dragged by elephants into the battlefield. They were somewhat risky to be used in the battlefield, since they exploded sometimes, killing the crew members. 
Light artillery was the most useful in the battle field. They were mainly made up of bronze and drawn by horses. This also included swivel guns born by camels. They were very effective on the battlefield.

Navy

The navy was the weakest branch of the Mughal military. The Empire did maintain warships, however they were relatively small. The fleet also consisted of transport ships. The Navy's main duty was controlling piracy, sometimes used in war.

Chelas

Chela were slave soldiers in the Mughal army. As a counterpoise to the mercenaries in their employ, over whom they had a very loose hold, commanders were in the habit of getting together, as the kernel of their force, a body of personal dependents or slaves, who had no one to look to except their master. Such troops were known by the Hindi name of chela (a slave). They were fed, clothed, and lodged by their employer, had mostly been brought up and trained by him, and had no other home than his camp. They were recruited chiefly from children taken in war or bought from their parents during times of famine. The great majority were of Hindu origin, but all were made Mahomedans when received into the body of chelas. These chelas were the only troops on which a man could place entire reliance as being ready to follow his fortunes in both foul and fair weather.

Like the Timurids and other Mongol-derived armies, and unlike other Islamic states, the Mughal empire did not use slave soldiers prominently. Slave soldiers were mainly placed in very lowly positions such as manual labourers, footmen and low-level officers rather than professional elite soldiers like Ghilman, Mamluks or Janissaries. However, eunuch officers were prized for their loyalty.

See also
 Mughal weapons
 Tipu Sultan

References

Further reading

Indian slaves
Military of the Mughal Empire
Military history of India
Military history of Pakistan
Military slavery